Beltempest is an original novel written by Jim Mortimore and based on the long-running British science fiction television series Doctor Who. It features the Eighth Doctor and Sam.

Blurb
The people of Bellania II see their sun, Bel, shrouded in night for a month following an impossible triple eclipse. When Bel is returned to them a younger, brighter, hotter star, it is the beginning of the end for the entire solar system... 
100,000 years later, the Doctor and Sam arrive on Bellania IV, where the population is under threat as disaster looms—immense gravitational and dimensional disturbances are surging through this area of space.

While the time travellers attempt to help the survivors and ease the devastation, a religious suicide-cult leader is determined to spread a new religion through Bel's system—and his word may prove even more dangerous than the terrible forces brought into being by the catastrophic changes in the sun...

External links

1998 British novels
1998 science fiction novels
Eighth Doctor Adventures
Novels by Jim Mortimore